Golovkino is the name of several rural localities in Russia:
Golovkino, Kaliningrad Oblast, a settlement in Golovkinsky Rural Okrug of Polessky District of Kaliningrad Oblast
Golovkino, Leningrad Oblast, a village in Nezhnovskoye Settlement Municipal Formation of Kingiseppsky District of Leningrad Oblast
Golovkino, Oryol Oblast, a village in Gagarinsky Selsoviet of Korsakovsky District of Oryol Oblast
Golovkino, Pskov Oblast, a village in Dedovichsky District of Pskov Oblast
Golovkino, Smolensk Oblast, a village in Selenskoye Rural Settlement of Tyomkinsky District of Smolensk Oblast
Golovkino, Tambov Oblast, a village in Fedorovsky Selsoviet of Sosnovsky District of Tambov Oblast
Golovkino, Staritsky District, Tver Oblast, a village in Novo-Yamskoye Rural Settlement of Staritsky District of Tver Oblast
Golovkino, Vyshnevolotsky District, Tver Oblast, a village in Dyatlovskoye Rural Settlement of Vyshnevolotsky District of Tver Oblast